Spain has five active nuclear power plants with seven reactors producing 21% of the country's electricity as of 2013.

A nuclear power moratorium was enacted by the Socialist government in 1983. For a time the country had a policy of phasing out nuclear power in favor of renewables. 
It ended in 1997 but no public or private company has been interested in building new nuclear plants. 
The oldest unit (at José Cabrera nuclear power plant) was shut down at the end of 2006, 40 years after its construction.
In December 2012, the Garoña plant was also shut down. 
In 2011, the government lifted the 40-year limit on all reactors, allowing owners to apply for license extensions in 10-year increments.

History
In early 1947, a commission was created within the National Research Council to deal with issues of "Technical Physics of greatest interest to the country". In the middle of that year, the Naval Attache of the United States Embassy in Spain, brought to the Laboratory and Workshop on Research Staff of the Navy an extensive collection of US journals specializing in nuclear fission and its civil and military applications.

To that end, establishing the Atomic Research Board in the form of study (Irani 1987). His work during the triennium (1948–1950) focuses on two aspects. On the one hand, begin to train abroad the first Spanish experts on nuclear issues. On the other hand, begins the search for uranium to serve as raw material for the development of the first investigations. Studies conducted by the Board, lead by Decree-Law on 22 October 1951 to the Nuclear Energy Board, which aims to provide new knowledge in the process of energy production.

In 1963, two significant events occur: the enactment of the Nuclear Energy Act and prior authorization from the Central will be the first Spanish (Almonacid de Zorita, Guadalajara) later known as Jose Cabrera. In June 1965 construction began three years after the plant was synchronized and provided power to the grid for the first time. Three years later it opened in 1971, launched the Santa Maria de Garoña (Burgos), with a capacity of 460MW. In 1972, the network was connected to the Spanish-French central Vandellós (Tarragona) with a capacity of 500MW.

Soon on a plan was drafted to open four nuclear stations in the Basque region, i.e. Deba, Lemóniz, Ispazter and Tudela. The plan faced strong opposition and protests across the area, with all four drafted nuclear stations finally concentrating in just one located at Lemoniz. However, following a violent campaign by ETA to stop it, it finally did not come into operation either. The Spanish government officially declared  a moratorium in 1984.

The fire occurred in 1989 in Vandellós destroyed part of its facilities. After evaluating the technical and economic feasibility of repair made a year after the fire, led to the decision to withdraw this plant.
Zorita, Vandellòs and Garoña, the three so-called first-generation plants, represent a combined capacity of 1,220 MW. Following the good results obtained in them, and the growing need for energy, it was decided to build seven new groups (four plants) of much greater production capacity, resulting in an additional nuclear power of 6,500 MW.

At the beginning of 1981, the first group of Almaraz (Cáceres) began producing power with a capacity of 930 MW. In 1983, the reactor Ascó (Tarragona) came into operation with a capacity of 930 MW, as well as a second group with the same power in Almaraz.

In 1984 he inaugurated the central Cofrents (Valencia) with a capacity of 975 MW, a year after the network is connected to the second reactor of 930 MW Ascó group. In December 1987, enters the central testing period Vandellós II, and finally, in 1989 is put into operation the central Trillo I (Guadalajara) to 1066 MW.

As shown, nuclear power plants in Spain are located in the northern half. This is because the area is less seismic impact of the peninsula and where the presence of large rivers Tajo and Ebro meet their needs for water used for cooling.

Current situation
Spain has a total of 10 nuclear installations within their mainland, among which are six stations, which are a total of eight nuclear units: Almaraz I and II, Ascó I and II, Cofrents, Trillo, Vandellós I and II.
The José Cabrera, better known as Zorita, ceased operations on 30 April 2006. So did Santa Maria de Garoña in 2012. On the other hand, Vandellós I is being dismantled.

Spain also possesses a nuclear fuel factory in Salamanca (Juzbado) and a storage facility for radioactive waste, low and intermediate level in Córdoba (El Cabril).

In 2018, Teresa Ribera signed an agreement with Endesa, Iberdrola and Naturgy, which postponed the decommission of all Spanish nuclear power plants from 2028 to 2035.

Nuclear power plants

In 1964, Spain began construction on its first of three nuclear reactors and completed construction in 1968.
This became the first commercial nuclear reactor. In the 1970s, Spain began construction on seven second generation reactors, but only completed five. A moratorium was enacted by the socialist government in 1983. Spain stopped the building of new nuclear power plants in 1984.

The first generation of nuclear plants in Spain were all turnkey projects, including the José Cabrera Nuclear Power Plant and the Vandellòs Nuclear Power Plant.

The second generation of plants were domestically built by companies including Empresarios Agrupados, INITEC and ENSA (Equipos Nucleares SA). Five of these were built.

The third generation of Spanish plants (not to be confused with Generation III) includes the Trillo-1 and Vandellos-2. All of the other five units of this series were halted in the middle of construction after a moratorium stopping further construction passed in 1994. Capacity of the nuclear fleet has still increased since then due to power uprates.

There are no plans for either expansion or accelerated closure of nuclear plants. A leak of radioactive material from the Ascó I nuclear power plant in November 2007 sparked protests. The country's government has pledged to shut down its eight nuclear reactors once wind and solar energy become viable alternatives such as in neighbouring country Portugal.

Fuel cycle

ENUSA is a company in Spain with various holdings in uranium mining. A Uranium mine in Saelices el Chico was operated for some time, but is now decommissioned and Spain imports all of its Uranium fuel.

State owned Empresa Nacional de Residuos Radiactivos SA was established in 1984 and is the responsible outfit for radioactive waste disposal and decommissioning. There is a temporary dry storage facility at the Trillo Nuclear Power Plant, and research for a long term geological repository won't commence until 2010.

Nuclear waste 
Spain stores nuclear waste at the reactor sites for ten years with no reprocessing. Plans for future storage include a temporary storage facility in Trillo, until the establishment of a longer-term storage facility. Funding for nuclear waste management is paid by a tax of 1% on all revenues from nuclear power.

As of 2017 Spain has extended the life of the Almaraz Nuclear Power Plant and a nuclear storage facility will be built according to the Spanish secretary of State for the EU Jorge Toledo Albiñana, stating work will start regardless of Portugals complaints, and uranium bars that will remain radioactive for the next 300 years will be stored on site.

See also 
Electricity sector in Spain
Energy in Spain
Anti-nuclear movement in Spain
Spanish Nuclear Safety Council

References

External links 
WNA profile: Nuclear Power in Spain

Science and technology in Spain